Daniel Nicholas DiNardo (born May 23, 1949) is an American cardinal of the Catholic Church. He is the second and current archbishop of the Archdiocese of Galveston-Houston in Texas serving since 2006. He previously served as bishop of the Diocese of Sioux City in Iowa from 1998 to 2004. 

On November 12, 2013, DiNardo was elected vice president of the United States Conference of Catholic Bishops (USCCB) and on November 15, 2016, was elected president.

DiNardo was elevated to the College of Cardinals by Pope Benedict XVI in 2007. He is the first cardinal from a diocese in the Southern United States.

Early life and education
Daniel DiNardo was born on May 23, 1949, in Steubenville, Ohio, to Nicholas and Jane (née Green) DiNardo. One of four children, he has an older brother, Thomas; a twin sister, Margaret; and a younger sister, Mary Anne. The family later moved to Castle Shannon, Pennsylvania. As a child, DiNardo would pretend to celebrate Mass in vestments sewn by his mother and at an altar his father constructed.

DiNardo attended St. Anne Elementary School in Castle Shannon from 1955 to 1963, and graduated from the Jesuit Bishop's Latin School in 1967.He then entered St. Paul Seminary at Duquesne University in Pittsburgh, Pennsylvania. In 1969, DiNardo was accepted as a Basselin Scholar in philosophy at the Theological College at Catholic University of America in Washington, D.C.  He received a Bachelor of Philosophy degree in 1971 and a Master of Philosophy degree in 1972.

DiNardo continued his studies in Rome, earning a Bachelor of Sacred Theology degree at the Pontifical Gregorian University and a Licentiate in Sacred Theology at the Patristic Institute "Augustinianum."

Priesthood
DiNardo was ordained to the priesthood for the Diocese of Pittsburgh by Bishop Leonard on July 16, 1977. He then served as parochial vicar at St. Pius X Parish in Brookline, Pennsylvania, until 1980. In 1981, DiNardo was named assistant chancellor of the diocese and part-time professor at St. Paul Seminary. While at St. Paul, he served as spiritual director to the seminarians.

From 1984 to 1990, DiNardo worked in Rome as a staff member of the Congregation for Bishops in the Roman Curia. During this time, he also served as the director of Villa Stritch (1986–1989), the house for American clergy working for the Holy See, and as an adjunct professor at the Pontifical North American College.

Upon his return to Pittsburgh in 1991, DiNardo was named assistant secretary for education for the diocese and concurrently served as co-pastor at Madonna del Castello Parish in Swissvale, Pennsylvania. He became the founding pastor of Saints John & Paul Parish in Franklin Park, Pennsylvania, in 1994.

Episcopal career

Bishop of Sioux City

On August 19, 1997, DiNardo was appointed coadjutor bishop of the Diocese of Sioux City by Pope John Paul II. He received his episcopal consecration on October 7, 1997, from Bishop Lawrence Soens, with Bishops Donald Wuerl and Raymond Burke serving as co-consecrators, in the Church of the Nativity of Our Lord Jesus Christ. DiNardo adopted as his episcopal motto: Ave Crux Spes Unica, taken from the Latin hymn Vexilla Regis and meaning, "Hail, O Cross, Our Only Hope."

DiNardo succeeded Soens as the sixth bishop of  the Diocese of Sioux City upon the latter's resignation on November 28, 1998.

Coadjutor Archbishop and Archbishop of Galveston-Houston
DiNardo was later named coadjutor bishop of the Diocese of Galveston-Houston, by John Paul II on January 16, 2004. The diocese was elevated to the rank of a metropolitan archdiocese by John Paul II on December 29, 2004 and he thus became coadjutor archbishop. 

When Pope Benedict XVI accepted the resignation of Archbishop Joseph Fiorenza, DiNardo succeeded him as the second archbishop of Galveston-Houston on February 28, 2006. He received the pallium, a vestment worn by metropolitan bishops, from Benedict XVI on June 29 of that year. DiNardo once commented, "There is a certain sense of the church in Texas...It is more laid-back, informal, which I think is good."

DiNardo was created cardinal-priest of S. Eusebio in the consistory of November 24, 2007. In 2008 he was awarded the Knight Grand Cross of the Order of Merit of the Italian Republic.

On January 17, 2009, DiNardo was named to the Pontifical Council for Culture. In March 2009, he described the choice of President Barack Obama to be the commencement speaker for the University of Notre Dame's graduation ceremony as "very disappointing," given Obama's support for legal abortion.

DiNardo is a board member of the National Catholic Partnership for Persons with Disabilities. He is also a board member of Catholic University of America in Washington, D.C., an advisor to the National Association of Pastoral Musicians, a member of the Pontifical Council for the Pastoral Care of Migrants and Itinerant People and a member of the Ad Hoc Committee to Oversee the Use of the Catechism for the USCCB DiNardo is the grand prior of the South West Lieutenancy of the Order of the Holy Sepulchre, a papal order of knighthood, in which he holds the rank of knight grand cross.

DiNardo was a cardinal elector who participated in the 2013 papal conclave that selected Pope Francis.

On November 14, 2014, at the USCCB fall meeting,  DiNardo was elected as a delegate to the 2015 Synod of Bishops on the Family, pending Vatican approval.

DiNardo promised to release a list of archdiocesan priests with credible accusations of sexual abuse of minors in January 2019. In November, CBS News spoke to 20 people who claim to have knowledge of incidents of misconduct, and none of them had been contacted.On January 30, 2019, DiNardo released a list of names of 40 priests from the archdiocese with credible allegations of sexual misconduct over the previous 70 years. One name on the list was John Keller. DiNardo was criticized for allowing Keller to offer Mass publicly at his parish the morning after the list was released.

Personal
DiNardo wears hearing aids because calcium deposits in his ears have impaired his hearing. Despite his hearing difficulties, he still prefers to sing or chant parts of the Mass.DiNardo suffered a stroke on March 15, 2019.

See also

 Christianity in Houston
 Catholic Church hierarchy
 Catholic Church in the United States
 Historical list of the Catholic bishops of the United States
 List of Catholic bishops of the United States
 Lists of patriarchs, archbishops, and bishops

References

External links
 
 Cardinal Dinardo's Official Page for the Archdiocese of Galveston-Houston
 Bio of Cardinal Dinardo
 Interview with the London Catholic Herald
 Roman Catholic Archdiocese of Galveston–Houston

1949 births
Living people
21st-century American cardinals
Roman Catholic archbishops of Galveston–Houston
Catholic University of America alumni
Catholic University of America trustees
Duquesne University alumni
American people of Italian descent
Religious leaders from Pittsburgh
People from Steubenville, Ohio
Knights Grand Cross of the Order of Merit of the Italian Republic
Roman Catholic Archdiocese of Galveston–Houston
Roman Catholic bishops of Sioux City
Cardinals created by Pope Benedict XVI
Pontifical Gregorian University alumni
Pontifical North American College alumni
Members of the Pontifical Council for Culture
Religious leaders from Texas
Members of the Order of the Holy Sepulchre
Catholics from Ohio